Buphenine (or nylidrin; trade name Arlidin) is a β2 adrenoreceptor agonist that acts as a vasodilator.

It was developed as a chemical derivative of oxilofrine, and first reported in the literature in 1950.

See also
Isoxsuprine

References

Beta2-adrenergic agonists
NMDA receptor antagonists
Phenols
Phenylethanolamines